The 2002 FINA Men's Water Polo World Cup was the twelfth edition of the event, organised by the world's governing body in aquatics, the International Swimming Federation (FINA). The event took place in the Tašmajdan Swimming Pool in Belgrade, Yugoslavia from August 20 to August 25, 2002. Participating teams were the eight best teams from the last World Championships in Fukuoka, Japan (2001).

The FINA Cup in Belgrade decided which teams qualified directly to the 2003 World Aquatics Championships in Barcelona, Spain from July 13 to July 27, 2003. Russia and Hungary, as well as the host Spain, already qualified based on the results from the 2002 FINA Men's Water Polo World League (June 28 – August 4, 2002).

Teams

Group A
 
 
 

Group B

Squads

Teo Đogaš
Nikola Franković
Hrvoje Herceg
Igor Hinić 
Hrvoje Koljanin

Aljoša Kunač
Ivan Milaković 
Dalibor Perčinić 
Danijel Premuš
Tomislav Primorac

Ratko Štritof
Goran Volarević
Tihomil Vranješ
Head coach:
Veselin Đuho

Christos Afroudakis
Theodoros Chatzitheodorou
Nikolaos Deligiannis
Theodoros Kalakonas 
Konstantinos Loudis

Dimitrios Mazis
Georgios Reppas
Stefanos Santa
Anastasios Schizas
Argyris Theodoropoulos 

Ioannis Thomakos 
Dimitrios Tsiklos
Antonios Vlontakis
Head coach:
Takis Michalos

Alberto Angelini 
Fabio Bencivenga 
Leonardo Binchi 
Fabrizio Buonocore 
Alessandro Calcaterra 

Roberto Calcaterra 
Maurizio Felugo 
Francesco Ferrari 
Goran Fiorentini 
Federico Mistrangelo 

Francesco Postiglione 
Bogdan Rath 
Stefano Tempesti 
Head coach:
Alessandro Campagna

Attila Bárány 
Tibor Benedek 
Péter Biros 
Rajmund Fodor 
Tamás Kásás 

Gergely Katonás
Gergely Kiss 
Zoltán Kovács 
Csaba Kiss 
Tamás Molnár 

Barnabás Steinmetz 
Zoltán Szécsi 
Attila Vári 
Head coach:
Dénes Kemény

Revaz Chomakhidze
Denis Denisov
Aleksandr Fyodorov 
Serguei Garbouzov
Dmitry Gorshkov

Nikolay Kozlov
Nikolay Maximov
Andrei Reketchinski
Dmitri Stratan
Yuri Yatsev

Alexander Yerishev 
Marat Zakirov
Irek Zinnourov
Head coach:
Aleksandr Kabanov

Tony Azevedo 
Ryan Bailey 
Layne Beaubien 
Larry Felix 
Peter Hudnut 

Dan Klatt
Genai Kerr 
Merrill Moses 
Jeff Powers
Chris Segesman

Jesse Smith 
Wolf Wigo 
Adam Wright
Head coach:
Ratko Rudić

Aleksandar Ćirić
Danilo Ikodinović
Nikola Janović
Viktor Jelenić
Nikola Kuljača

Aleksandar Šapić
Dejan Savić
Denis Šefik
Petar Trbojević
Vanja Udovičić

Vladimir Vujasinović
Nenad Vukanić
Boris Zloković
Head coach:
Nenad Manojlović

Preliminary round

Group A

August 20, 2002

August 21, 2002

August 22, 2002

Group B

August 20, 2002

August 21, 2002

August 22, 2002

Quarterfinals
August 23, 2002

Semifinals
August 24, 2002

Finals
August 23, 2002 — Seventh place

August 24, 2002 — Fifth place

August 25, 2002 — Third place

August 25, 2002 — First place

Final ranking

Yugoslavia, Italy, Greece and the United States qualified for the 2003 World Aquatics Championships. Russia and Hungary, as well as the host Spain, already qualified.

Individual awards
Most Valuable Player

Best Goalkeeper

Topscorer
 — 13 goals

References

2002
F
W
2002